Otakar "Otto, Vend" Vindyš (9 April 1889 – 23 December 1949) was a Czechoslovak ice hockey defenseman who competed in the 1920 Summer Olympics and in the 1924 Winter Olympics. Vindyš was a native of Prague, Czechoslovakia.

Career
In 1911, Vindyš won the European Championship with Bohemia.

He was a member of the Czechoslovak national team which won the bronze medal at the 1920 Summer Olympics. Four years later he also participated in the first Winter Olympic ice hockey tournament.

References

External links
 
profile

1889 births
1949 deaths
Czech ice hockey right wingers
Czechoslovak ice hockey right wingers
HC Slavia Praha players
Ice hockey people from Prague
Ice hockey players at the 1920 Summer Olympics
Ice hockey players at the 1924 Winter Olympics
Medalists at the 1920 Summer Olympics
Olympic bronze medalists for Czechoslovakia
Olympic ice hockey players of Czechoslovakia
Olympic medalists in ice hockey
People from the Kingdom of Bohemia
Czech ice hockey defencemen
Czechoslovak ice hockey defencemen